The Kaibab Limestone is a resistant cliff-forming, Permian geologic formation that crops out across the U.S. states of northern Arizona, southern Utah, east central Nevada and southeast California.  It is also known as the Kaibab Formation in Arizona, Nevada, and Utah. The Kaibab Limestone forms the rim of the Grand Canyon. In the Big Maria Mountains, California, the Kaibab Limestone is highly metamorphosed and known as the Kaibab Marble.

Nomenclature

The Kaibab Limestone was named by Darton in 1910 for the Kaibab Plateau, which is on the north side of Grand Canyon in Coconino County, Arizona. In his definition of the Kaibab Limestone formation, no type locality was designated. He also designated the Kaibab Limestone as the upper formation of the Aubrey Group, a now-abandoned stratigraphic unit. In 1921, Bassler and Reeside revised Darton's work and defined the Harrisburg Member of the Kaibab Limestone. In his 1938 monograph on the Toroweap Formation and Kaibab Limestone of northern Arizona, McKee split Darton's original Kaibab Limestone into the currently recognized Kaibab Limestone and Toroweap Formation. He also revised Kaibab Limestone's lower contact and divided it into informal (descending) alpha, beta and gamma members. Later in the 1970s, its upper contact was revised and its areal extent were defined. Also, unsuccessful attempts were made to raise the formation to group rank and divide it into several formations. In 1982, Warren Hamilton renamed it as the Kaibab Marble and determined its areal extent for California. In 1991, Sorauf and Billingsley subdivided the Kaibab Limestone into (ascending) Fossil Mountain Member (new) and Harrisburg Member. They designated the strata comprising McKee's alpha (or upper) member as the Harrisburg Member and the strata comprising McKee's beta (or middle) member as the Fossil Mountain Member. The Fossil Mountain Member was named for Fossil Mountain along the south rim near the Bass Trail. McKee's gamma member is considered to be part of the Fossil Mountain Member. Later research has further redefined the regional extent of the Kaibab Limestone.

Description
The Kaibab Limestone is an assemblage of sedimentary rock types. It consists of a complexity of inter fingering and inter bedded carbonate and siliciclastic sedimentary rocks. In addition, intense post-depositional (diagenetic) changes have produced a more composition variation by the alteration of limestone to dolomite and the silicification of limestone to form chert. In the western Grand Canyon region, the Fossil Mountain Member consists of fossiliferous and cherty limestone with an abundant and diverse normal-marine fossil fauna. Further east in the Coconino Plateau region, the lithology, mineralogy, and fauna of the Fossil Mountain Member changes drastically where it grades laterally into sandy dolomite and dolomite that contains a restricted-marine fossil fauna and subordinate amounts of sandstone. The Harrisburg Member, which forms the uppermost cliffs and receding ledges along both north and south rims of the Grand Canyon, consists of an assemblage of gypsum, dolomite, sandstone, redbeds, chert, and minor limestone.

Contacts
Within the Grand Canyon region, the Kaibab Limestone overlies gypsum and contorted sandstones of the Toroweap Formation. Originally, geologists interpreted the lower contact of the Kaibab Limestone to be an unconformity based on the presence of local intraformational breccias and erosional surfaces. However, additional research has concluded that these local intraformational breccias and erosional surfaces are the result of collapse following the dissolution of evaporite deposits within the upper part of the Toroweap Formation. As a result, this contact is inferred to be conformable or only locally a disconformity. South and east of the Grand Canyon, the evaporites and contorted sandstones (sabkha deposits) of Toroweap Formation interfinger with and are replaced by cross-bedded sandstones of the Coconino Sandstone. As a result, the Kaibab Limestone directly overlies the Coconino Sandstone in the Mogollon Rim region. The Kaibab Limestone directly overlies the White Rim Sandstone in northeastern Arizona and southeastern Utah.

The upper contact of the Kaibab Limestone (Harrisburg Member) with the overlying Moenkopi Formation is an erosional unconformity and disconformity. Within northwestern Arizona, southeastern Nevada, and southwestern Utah this contact is an erosional unconformity that in part consists of paleovalleys, as much as several hundred feet deep, and paleokarst that were eroded into the underlying Kaibab Limestone before the deposition of the Moenkopi Formation. These paleovalleys are often filled with conglomerates and breccias that are known as the Rock Canyon conglomerate. Within the Marble Canyon and eastern Grand Canyon regions and south into Verde Valley, upper contact of the Kaibab Limestone with the Moenkopi Formation is an erosional disconformity. This disconformity exhibits little relief and is identified by marked differences in color, topography, and rock types between tan, ledge-forming, calcareous sandstones and of the Kaibab Limestone and red, slope-forming siltstones of the Moenkopi formation. The unconformity and disconformity are inferred to represent most of Permian time (including the Leonardian) and part of Early Triassic time.

Although the Moenkopi Formation overlies the Kaibab Limestone, its redbeds have been removed almost entirely by erosion because they are less resistant to erosion than the strata of the Kaibab Formation. As a result, the Kaibab Limestone forms the surface of many of the vast plateaus that border the Grand Canyon. Within these plateaus, the uppermost beds of the Kaibab Limestone have also been largely removed by erosion.

Fossils
The Kaibab Limestone contains the abundant fossils of Permian invertebrates and vertebrates. The invertebrate fossils found within the Kaibab Limestone include brachiopods, conodonts, corals, crinoids, echinoid spines, mollusks, hexactinellid and other sponges, trilobites, and burrows of callanassid shrimp. The fossil cephalopods found in the Kaibab Limestone include giant football-sized nautiloids. Fossil shark teeth, which represent a diverse assemblage of chondrichthyans, occur within the Kaibab Limestone of Arizona.

Depositional environments
The complex intercalation of carbonate and clastic sediments within the Kaibab Limestone reflects the deposition of sediments within a gently sloping continental margin during a period of frequent, high-frequency sea level changes. Relatively minor changes in sea level caused major lateral shifts in the position of supratidal, subtidal, and shallow-marine environments during the deposition of the Kaibab Limestone. The shifting sea levels and associated depositional environments brought about a complex interlayering of different types of carbonate and clastic sediments in the strata that comprise the Kaibab Limestone. The gently sloping continental margin on which the Kaibab Limestone accumulated, extended seaward from northern Arizona to southern Nevada, at times exceeding 200 miles (125 km) in width. It is most likely that the high-frequency changes in sea level were caused by glacial sea level oscillations during this time period.

Age
Early paleontological studies of the Kaibab Limestone firmly established its age on the basis of the abundant fossils that it and the underlying Toroweap Formation contain. On the basis of its brachiopod and siliceous sponge faunas, it was initially concluded that it is Leonardian (approximately Kungurian / latest Early Permian) in age. Later research concerning conodonts and associated megafossils obtained from western outcrops of the Fossil Mountain Member indicates that its age extends into the Roadian (latest Early Permian and earliest Middle Permian) age.

Geographic distribution
Geologic Province:
 Basin and Range province*
 Black Mesa Basin*
 Great Basin province*
 Paradox Basin*
 Plateau Sedimentary Province*
 Salton Basin*

Parklands (incomplete list):
 Capitol Reef National Park – See Geology of the Capitol Reef area
 Grand Canyon – See Geology of the Grand Canyon area
 Zion National Park – See Geology of the Zion and Kolob canyons area
 Grand Staircase–Escalante National Monument

Other:
 Blue Diamond Mine on Blue Diamond Hill in Clark County, Nevada

See also

 List of types of limestone
 Geology of the Grand Canyon area

References

Popular references
 Blakey, R., and W. Ranney, 2008, Ancient Landscapes of the Colorado Plateau. Grand Canyon Association, Grand Canyon Village, Arizona. 176 pp. 
 Chronic, H., 1983, Roadside Geology of Arizona. 23rd printing. Mountain Press Publishing Company, Missoula Montana. 322 pp. 
 Lucchitta, I., 2001, Hiking Arizona's Geology. Mountaineers's Books, Seattle, Washington. 269 pp.

External links
 Abbot, W, 2001, Revisiting the Grand Canyon – Through the Eyes of Seismic Sequence Stratigraphy. Search and Discovery Article # 40018, America Association of Petroleum Geologists, Tulsa, Oklahoma.
 Anonymous, nda, The Kaibab Limestone. Utah Geology.
 Anonymous, ndb, Fossils. Grand Canyon National Park, National Park Service, Canyon Village, Arizona.
 Mathis, A., and C. Bowman, 2007, The Grand Age of Rocks: The Numeric Ages for Rocks Exposed within Grand Canyon, Grand Canyon National Park, Arizona, National Park Service, Grand Canyon National Park, Arizona.
 Shur, C., and D. Shur, 2008, The Kaibab Limestone in Northern Arizona. Arizona Fossil Adventures.

Limestone formations of the United States
Natural history of the Grand Canyon
Geologic formations of Arizona
Geologic formations of California
Geologic formations of Nevada
Geologic formations of Utah
Permian Arizona
Permian California
Permian geology of Nevada
Permian geology of Utah
Cisuralian Series of North America